The Austin Aztex were a soccer team based in Austin, Texas, United States. Founded in 2011 as a member of the Premier Development League, the team played the 2015 season in the United Soccer League, the second tier of the United States soccer pyramid. This was the second team to carry the name Austin Aztex; the first were founded in 2008 and relocated to Orlando in 2010, with that ownership group eventually being awarded an MLS franchise of the same name in that city.

The 'new' Aztex played their home games at the 6,500-seat House Park just west of the downtown Austin core, until that stadium was severely damaged by the 2015 Memorial Day floods; for the remainder of that season, they played at Kelly Reeves Athletic Complex.

On October 2, 2015, the Aztex announced that, due to the fact that neither House Park nor Kelly Reeves met league stadium standards, and to difficulty in procuring a stadium that meets those standards, the team would be on hiatus during the 2016 USL season. The Aztex planned to resume competition in 2018 after the stadium issue was resolved but in the event, did not return to the USL.

USL Championship soccer returned to Austin with the newly formed Austin Bold FC beginning play in 2019 at their own stadium at the Circuit of the Americas. A Major League Soccer franchise was awarded to Precourt Sports Ventures, former owners of Columbus Crew SC, to begin play in 2021 as Austin FC.

History

Rebirth of the Aztex
The latest incarnation of the Austin Aztex was founded by David Markley, who was a minority owner of the original Aztex. The previous team's majority owners moved the organization to Orlando, Florida at the end of the 2010 season and renamed the team Orlando City SC.

In September 2011, Markley announced plans to create a new Austin Aztex team which would compete in the Premier Development League beginning in the 2012 season. The new Aztex played their first game on May 5, 2012 at Woodforest Bank Stadium, home of the Texas Dutch Lions, and defeated the hosts 4–0.  The first Aztex goal was scored by midfielder Tony Rocha on a free kick in the 6th minute of play. The Aztex's first home game was played on May 19, 2012 against the El Paso Patriots before a crowd of 2,507.  The Aztex rose to the occasion with a 6–1 win, with Kris Tyrpak providing three of the Aztex's six goals.

The reborn Aztex finished their first season with 9 wins, 5 losses, and 2 draws. They won their first playoff game against the Ocala Stampede but fell to Orlando City U-23's in the Southern Conference final.

In preparation for the move to USL Pro, the Aztex introduced a new logo and affiliated with the Columbus Crew SC, an MLS club which had also recently undergone a logo change.

Colors and badge
The Aztex kits were dark blue with gold numbers and gold trim.  Their alternate kits were white with gold trim and numbering.  Kits were provided by Admiral Sportswear.  Emergo Group, an international regulatory consulting firm headquartered in Austin, served as the team's jersey sponsor from 2012 through 2014.

The Aztex badge was blue and gold with a Texas lone star, a soccer ball, and the word "AzTeX" with an enlarged A, T, and X.  "ATX" is shorthand for Austin, Texas.

Year-by-year

Honors
USL PDL

 USL PDL Champions: 2013
 Southern Conference Champions: 2013
 Mid-South Division Champions: 2013, 2014

Head coaches
 Paul Dalglish (2012–2014)
 Manuel Buentello (2014)
 Paul Dalglish (2014–2015)

See also
Austin Lightning
Austin Aztex FC
Austin Aztex U23

References

External links
Austin Aztex Official Website
Eberly's Army – the supporters group for Austin Aztex.

 
USL League Two teams
Association football clubs established in 2011
2011 establishments in Texas
Former USL Championship teams
Association football clubs disestablished in 2017
Sports in Austin, Texas
Soccer clubs in Texas